Peter John Henry Elliott (14 June 1930 – December 2016) was a British film actor, singer, dancer, stunt performer and television presenter.

Life and career
Elliott had been diving since the age of 12 at the Marshall Street swimming pool when he was approached by Sid Dalton, an Olympic coach. He trained seriously and represented Britain in the Olympic Games of 1948 and 1952, in London, England. He won a bronze medal in high diving at the 1953 Maccabiah Games in Israel.

Elliott later became a pop singer and was a resident ballad singer on ATV's Oh Boy!. He has written a number of successful film scores, two of which have won awards at Cannes Film Festivals.

Filmography

Film

Television

References

External links
 

1930 births
2016 deaths
South African male film actors
English male television actors
English stunt performers
English pop singers
English male divers
Maccabiah Games competitors by sport
Competitors at the 1953 Maccabiah Games
Maccabiah Games bronze medalists for Great Britain
Olympic divers of Great Britain
Divers at the 1948 Summer Olympics
Divers at the 1952 Summer Olympics